The Swedish Civil Contingencies Agency is a Swedish administrative authority, organised under the Ministry of Justice. The agency is responsible for issues concerning civil protection, public safety, emergency management and civil defence. Responsibility refers to measures taken before, during and after an emergency or crisis. MSB work in close cooperation with the municipalities, the county councils, other authorities, organisations and the private sector to achieve increased safety and security at all levels of society. This is done through education, support, training exercises, regulation and supervision.

The agency covers the whole spectrum of contingencies; from everyday road traffic accidents and fires, up to chemical emergencies, power cuts and other technical failures. Additionally, more serious emergencies, such as bomb threats and other antagonistic attacks, epidemics, natural disasters and war. In most cases, the responsibility for on-scene action does not lie with the Civil Contingencies Agency but with municipal rescue services, law enforcement agencies or other agencies.

History
The Swedish Civil Contingencies Agency was established 1 January 2009, when Swedish Rescue Services Agency, the Swedish Emergency Management Agency and the Swedish National Board of Psychological Defence were merged into one body.

During the 2018 Sweden wildfires, Sweden requested help from European Union through the Emergency Response Coordination Centre at the European Commission's Directorate-General for European Civil Protection and Humanitarian Aid Operations department. Sweden received help from Estonia, France, Finland, Germany, Italy, Lithuania, Poland and Portugal. The help included firefighters, equipment and water bombing aircraft. Polish state-owned television channel Telewizja Polska later claimed that "Sweden needed help as the country lacks firefighting capabilities, having prioritized spending on immigration and gender theory education.", due to the agency having spent 1.9% of their research budget (21m SEK, roughly €2m) on equality and on gender theory to investigate relations during crisis management. The agency responded that they considered the accusation to be fake news, as the agency has nothing to do with firefighting, as Swedish fire and rescue service brigades are funded by the municipalities and regions.

Organisation
The MSB is based in Stockholm, Karlstad, Kristinehamn and Ljung. The MSB also has some colleges in Sandö, Revinge and Rosersberg. The agency has about 850 employees, led by Director-General Dan Eliasson. It's organised into five departments: Risk & Vulnerability Reduction Department, Emergency Management Development Department, Coordination and Operations Department, Evaluation and Monitoring Department and the Administration Department.

Directors-General
2009–2017: Helena Lindberg 
2018–2021: Dan Eliasson
7 January 2021–present: Camilla Asp (acting)

See also
 Ministry of Justice (Sweden)

References

External links
 The Swedish Civil Contingencies Agency - Official site (English)

2009 establishments in Sweden
Defence agencies of Sweden
Government agencies established in 2009
Civil Contingencies Agency
Emergency services in Sweden